Wiśniowa  is a village in the administrative district of Gmina Staszów, within Staszów County, Świętokrzyskie Voivodeship, in south-central Poland.

The village has a population of  627.

Demography 
According to the 2002 Poland census, there were 599 people residing in Wiśniowa village, of whom 48.6% were male and 51.4% were female. In the village, the population was spread out, with 27.5% under the age of 18, 37.4% from 18 to 44, 20.9% from 45 to 64, and 14.2% who were 65 years of age or older.
 Figure 1. Population pyramid of village in 2002 — by age group and sex

See also
 The Lesser Polish Way

References

Villages in Staszów County